Syntypistis jupiter is a species of moth of the family Notodontidae first described by Alexander Schintlmeister in 1997. It is found in China (Hainan, Yunnan), India, Vietnam and Thailand.

References

Moths described in 1997
Notodontidae